Luena is a municipality located in the autonomous community of Cantabria, Spain. According to the 2007 census, the municipality has a population of 831 inhabitants. Its capital is San Miguel de Luena. The municipality consists of a valley which runs from the Cantabrian Mountains to the North, until it reaches the valley of the river Pas. It is a markedly rural area, where the traditional economic activity evolves around the cow.

Towns
Bollacín
Bustasur
Carrascal de Cocejón
Carrascal de San Miguel
Cazpurrión
El Cocejón
Entrambasmestas

Llano
Los Pandos
Pandoto
La Parada
Penilla
La Puente
Resconorio
Retuerta
San Andrés de Luena
San Miguel de Luena (capital)
Sel de la Carrera
Sel de la Peña
Sel del Hoyo
Sel del Manzano
Selviejo
Tablado
Urdiales
Vega Escobosa
La Ventona
Vozpornoche

References

External links
Luena - Cantabria 102 Municipios

Municipalities in Cantabria